Liang Su-yung (8 August 1920 – 27 August 2004) was a Taiwanese politician who served in the first Legislative Yuan from 1948 to 1991. He was elevated to vice president of the parliament in 1988, and retired in 1991 as its leader. Prior to his political career, he worked as a human rights lawyer.

Career
Born in Changtu County in 1920, Liang obtained an LLD and SJD from Japan's Meiji University, after having studied at Changchun Law and Political University. In 1941, he became a prosecutor in Changchun. In the midst of the Second Sino-Japanese War, Liang became an intelligence operative based in northeastern China, feeding information within the Japanese-occupied territory to Chongqing, the provincial capital of Chiang Kai-shek's Nationalist government. Liang was arrested and taken as a Japanese prisoner of war in 1944. He was released upon Japanese surrender in 1945. The experience left a tremendous impression on Liang, who would make the cause of human rights a motif of his life's work. Liang was elected as a legislator for his home province of Liaoning in 1948 as hostilities between Kuomintang and Chinese Communist Party forces resumed following the Japanese surrender. Liang followed Chiang to Taiwan after the KMT were driven off the mainland completely in 1949.

Under martial law in Taiwan, Liang gained a reputation as a fierce defender of human rights and advocated non-violence with regards to the protest movement, in contrast to the more militarist wing of the KMT. He stepped forward in 1960 to defend pro-democracy activist Lei Chen, who was charged with sedition for criticizing Chiang's regime. Liang's defense of Lei angered Chiang, who strongly considered Liang's expulsion from the Kuomintang. Despite this threat, Liang later defended Peng Ming-min, who stood accused of the same charges in 1964. After Chiang's death in 1975, Liang worked as a troubleshooter for the better part of a decade between Chiang's son, Chiang Ching-kuo, and the Tangwai movement as the government began to relax some controls on free speech and political dissent. Liang also took credit for persuading Chiang Ching-kuo to handle protests in a peaceful manner. Liang was one of the founding members of the National Unification Council formed in 1990. In 1991, Liang became the leader of the Legislative Yuan. He was involved in a fight on the floor of the parliament that same year. It began when Democratic Progressive Party legislator Chang Chun-hsiung hit Liang in the face, causing Liang to respond in kind. Liang was also injured by a glass thrown by Ju Gau-jeng. In addition to his position as a legislator, Liang was also a senior advisor to President Lee Teng-hui.

After his retirement from politics, Liang became president of the Straits Peaceful Reunification Association. Personally, he continually pushed for Chinese unification, opposed Lee's policy of Taiwanization, and repeatedly attempted to expel Lee from the Kuomintang.

Liang died of anaphylactic shock caused by pneumonia at Cathay General Hospital in Taipei on 27 August 2004, at the age of 84.

References

Prisoners of war held by Japan
Kuomintang Members of the Legislative Yuan in Taiwan
Members of the 1st Legislative Yuan
1920 births
2004 deaths
Republic of China politicians from Liaoning
Chinese prisoners of war
Meiji University alumni
Military personnel of the Republic of China in the Second Sino-Japanese War
Members of the 1st Legislative Yuan in Taiwan
20th-century Taiwanese lawyers
Taiwanese Presidents of the Legislative Yuan
Deaths from pneumonia in Taiwan
Deaths from anaphylaxis
Senior Advisors to President Lee Teng-hui
Taiwanese people from Liaoning
Human rights lawyers
Politicians from Tieling